Makawao is a census-designated place (CDP) in Maui County, Hawaii, United States.  The population was 7,297 at the 2020 census. Located on the rural northwest slope of Haleakala on East Maui, the community is known for being the hub of the "Upcountry", a part of the island dominated by mostly agriculture and ranch land. Makawao Forest Reserve is to the east-northeast.

Geography
Makawao is located at  (20.853657, -156.316951).

Demographics

At the 2000 census, there were 6,327 people, 2,151 households, and 1,565 families in the CDP. The racial makeup of the CDP was 40.54% White, 0.32% African American, 0.55% Native American, 17.04% Asian, 8.74% Pacific Islander, 1.56% from other races, and 31.25% from two or more races. Hispanic or Latino of any race were 11.93% of the population.

Of the 2,151 households 41.4% had children under the age of 18 living with them, 51.7% were married couples living together, 14.8% had a female householder with no husband present, and 27.2% were non-families. 17.6% of households were one person and 4.6% were one person aged 65 or older.  The average household size was 2.94 and the average family size was 3.34.

The age distribution was 29.6% under the age of 18, 7.9% from 18 to 24, 32.0% from 25 to 44, 23.4% from 45 to 64, and 7.2% 65 or older.  The median age was 35 years. For every 100 females, there were 99.5 males.  For every 100 females age 18 and over, there were 93.2 males.

The median household income was $46,681 and the median family income  was $50,145. Males had a median income of $32,917 versus $26,955 for females. The per capita income for the CDP was $18,776.  About 7.4% of families and 9.6% of the population were below the poverty line, including 10.7% of those under age 18 and 9.7% of those age 65 or over.

References

External links

 City-Data on Makawao

 
Census-designated places in Maui County, Hawaii
Populated places on Maui